Rasah is a mukim in Seremban District, Negeri Sembilan, Malaysia.

Places of worship 
There are places of worship for many faiths in Rasah. The most prominent one is Rasah Shri Mahamariamman Temple, situated in the foothills near Tuanku Ja'afar Hospital

Demographics
Rasah consist of 46.5% Chinese, 30.7% Malay and 22.4% Indian and 0.4% others.

Housing estates
Rasah has many housing estates encircling it including Kampung Dato Mansor, Kampung Pasir, Taman Sri Pulasan, Taman Lian, Taman Nee Yan, Taman Klana Jubli, Taman Bukit Chedang, Taman Dato' Raja Mohd Hanifah, Taman Rasah, Taman Rasah Jaya, Taman Desa Rasah, Taman Harapan Baru, Taman Happy, Taman Thivy Jaya, Taman Sri Putih, Taman Nuri Indah, Taman Anggur, Taman Bukit Rasah, Taman Belimbing and Taman Limau Emas

Notable people
 Sheikh Haji Muhammad Saleh (also known as Tuanku Tambusai) -  a leader during the Padri War in 1838

References 

Mukims of Negeri Sembilan